Sycamore Community School District is a school district in southwestern Ohio, United States,  mainly in Hamilton County and the Greater Cincinnati area.  It is commonly referred to as "Sycamore Community Schools". The district includes the communities of Blue Ash, Montgomery, Symmes Township, and some parts of Sycamore Township.

In 2007 the district was rated "excellent" by the Ohio Department of Education, the highest rating, for the eighth consecutive year.

The four elementary schools are for students kindergarten to fourth grade: Blue Ash Elementary, Maple Dale Elementary, Montgomery Elementary, and Symmes Elementary. Edwin H. Greene Intermediate (E.H. Greene) is the following intermediate school that contains students grades five and six. Sycamore Junior High (SJH) is for students grades seven and eight. Sycamore High School (SHS) is for students grades nine to twelve.

Schools
High School
Sycamore High School
Intermediate Schools
Sycamore Junior High School
Edwin H. Greene Intermediate School
Elementary Schools
Blue Ash Elementary School
Maple Dale Elementary School
Montgomery Elementary School
Symmes Elementary School

See also
List of school districts in Ohio

References

External links
www.sycamoreschools.org

Education in Hamilton County, Ohio
School districts in Ohio
Education in Cincinnati